Martin Luther  (10 November 1483 – 18 February 1546) was a German priest, theologian, author, hymnwriter, professor, and Augustinian friar. He is the seminal figure of the Protestant Reformation whose followers became known as Lutherans. 

Luther was ordained to the priesthood in 1507. He came to reject several teachings and practices of the Roman Catholic Church; in particular, he disputed the view on indulgences. Luther proposed an academic discussion of the practice and efficacy of indulgences in his Ninety-five Theses of 1517. His refusal to renounce all of his writings at the demand of Pope Leo X in 1520 and the Holy Roman Emperor Charles V at the Diet of Worms in 1521 resulted in his excommunication by the pope and condemnation as an outlaw by the Holy Roman Emperor. Luther died in 1546 with Pope Leo X's excommunication still in effect.

Luther taught that salvation and, consequently, eternal life are not earned by good deeds; rather, they are received only as the free gift of God's grace through the believer's faith in Jesus Christ as redeemer from sin. His theology challenged the authority and office of the pope by teaching that the Bible is the only source of divinely revealed knowledge, and opposed sacerdotalism by considering all baptized Christians to be a holy priesthood. Those who identify with these, and all of Luther's wider teachings, are called Lutherans, though Luther insisted on Christian or Evangelical (German: evangelisch) as the only acceptable names for individuals who professed Christ. His translation of the Bible into the German vernacular (instead of Latin) made it more accessible to the laity, an event that had a tremendous impact on both the church and German culture. It fostered the development of a standard version of the German language, added several principles to the art of translation, and influenced the writing of an English translation, the Tyndale Bible. His hymns influenced the development of singing in Protestant churches. His marriage to Katharina von Bora, a former nun, set a model for the practice of clerical marriage, allowing Protestant clergy to marry. 

In two of his later works, Luther expressed anti-Judaistic views, calling for the expulsion of Jews and burning of synagogues. In addition, these works also targeted Roman Catholics, Anabaptists, and nontrinitarian Christians. Based upon his teachings, the prevailing view among historians is that his rhetoric contributed significantly to the development of antisemitism in Germany and of the Nazi Party.

Early life

Birth and education

Martin Luther was born to Hans Luder (or Ludher, later Luther) and his wife Margarethe (née Lindemann) on 10 November 1483 in Eisleben, County of Mansfeld, in the Holy Roman Empire. Luther was baptized the next morning on the feast day of St. Martin of Tours. In 1484, his family moved to Mansfeld, where his father was a leaseholder of copper mines and smelters and served as one of four citizen representatives on the local council; in 1492 he was elected as a town councilor. The religious scholar Martin Marty describes Luther's mother as a hard-working woman of "trading-class stock and middling means", contrary to Luther's enemies, who labeled her a whore and bath attendant.

He had several brothers and sisters and is known to have been close to one of them, Jacob.

Hans Luther was ambitious for himself and his family, and he was determined to see Martin, his eldest son, become a lawyer. He sent Martin to Latin schools in Mansfeld, then Magdeburg in 1497, where he attended a school operated by a lay group called the Brethren of the Common Life, and Eisenach in 1498. The three schools focused on the so-called "trivium": grammar, rhetoric, and logic. Luther later compared his education there to purgatory and hell.

In 1501, at age 17, he entered the University of Erfurt, which he later described as a beerhouse and whorehouse. He was made to wake at four every morning for what has been described as "a day of rote learning and often wearying spiritual exercises." He received his master's degree in 1505.

In accordance with his father's wishes, he enrolled in law but dropped out almost immediately, believing that law represented uncertainty. Luther sought assurances about life and was drawn to theology and philosophy, expressing particular interest in Aristotle, William of Ockham, and Gabriel Biel. He was deeply influenced by two tutors, Bartholomaeus Arnoldi von Usingen and Jodocus Trutfetter, who taught him to be suspicious of even the greatest thinkers and to test everything himself by experience.

Philosophy proved to be unsatisfying, offering assurance about the use of reason but none about loving God, which to Luther was more important. Reason could not lead men to God, he felt, and he thereafter developed a love-hate relationship with Aristotle over the latter's emphasis on reason. For Luther, reason could be used to question men and institutions, but not God. Human beings could learn about God only through divine revelation, he believed, and Scripture therefore became increasingly important to him.

On 2 July 1505, while Luther was returning to university on horseback after a trip home, a lightning bolt struck near him during a thunderstorm. Later telling his father he was terrified of death and divine judgment, he cried out, "Help! Saint Anna, I will become a monk!" He came to view his cry for help as a vow he could never break. He left university, sold his books, and entered St. Augustine's Monastery in Erfurt on 17 July 1505. One friend blamed the decision on Luther's sadness over the deaths of two friends. Luther himself seemed saddened by the move. Those who attended a farewell supper walked him to the door of the Black Cloister. "This day you see me, and then, not ever again," he said. His father was furious over what he saw as a waste of Luther's education.

Monastic life

Luther dedicated himself to the Augustinian order, devoting himself to fasting, long hours in prayer, pilgrimage, and frequent confession. Luther described this period of his life as one of deep spiritual despair. He said, "I lost touch with Christ the Savior and Comforter, and made of him the jailer and hangman of my poor soul."

Johann von Staupitz, his superior, concluded that Luther needed more work to distract him from excessive introspection and ordered him to pursue an academic career. On 3 April 1507, Jerome Schultz (lat. Hieronymus Scultetus), the Bishop of Brandenburg, ordained Luther in Erfurt Cathedral. In 1508, he began teaching theology at the University of Wittenberg. He received a bachelor's degree in biblical studies on 9 March 1508 and another bachelor's degree in the Sentences by Peter Lombard in 1509. On 19 October 1512, he was awarded his Doctor of Theology and, on 21 October 1512, was received into the senate of the theological faculty of the University of Wittenberg, having succeeded von Staupitz as chair of theology. He spent the rest of his career in this position at the University of Wittenberg.

He was made provincial vicar of Saxony and Thuringia by his religious order in 1515. This meant he was to visit and oversee each of eleven monasteries in his province.

Start of the Reformation

In 1516, Johann Tetzel, a Dominican friar, was sent to Germany by the Roman Catholic Church to sell indulgences to raise money in order to rebuild St. Peter's Basilica in Rome. Tetzel's experiences as a preacher of indulgences, especially between 1503 and 1510, led to his appointment as general commissioner by Albrecht von Brandenburg, Archbishop of Mainz, who, deeply in debt to pay for a large accumulation of benefices, had to contribute the considerable sum of ten thousand ducats toward the rebuilding of St. Peter's Basilica in Rome. Albrecht obtained permission from Pope Leo X to conduct the sale of a special plenary indulgence (i.e., remission of the temporal punishment of sin), half of the proceeds of which Albrecht was to claim to pay the fees of his benefices.

On 31 October 1517, Luther wrote to his bishop, Albrecht von Brandenburg, protesting against the sale of indulgences. He enclosed in his letter a copy of his "Disputation on the Power and Efficacy of Indulgences", which came to be known as the Ninety-five Theses. Hans Hillerbrand writes that Luther had no intention of confronting the church but saw his disputation as a scholarly objection to church practices, and the tone of the writing is accordingly "searching, rather than doctrinaire." Hillerbrand writes that there is nevertheless an undercurrent of challenge in several of the theses, particularly in Thesis 86, which asks: "Why does the pope, whose wealth today is greater than the wealth of the richest Crassus, build the basilica of St. Peter with the money of poor believers rather than with his own money?"

Luther objected to a saying attributed to Tetzel that "As soon as the coin in the coffer rings, the soul from purgatory (also attested as 'into heaven') springs." He insisted that, since forgiveness was God's alone to grant, those who claimed that indulgences absolved buyers from all punishments and granted them salvation were in error. Christians, he said, must not slacken in following Christ on account of such false assurances.

According to one account, Luther nailed his Ninety-five Theses to the door of All Saints' Church in Wittenberg on 31 October 1517. Scholars Walter Krämer, Götz Trenkler, Gerhard Ritter, and Gerhard Prause contend that the story of the posting on the door, although it has become one of the pillars of history, has little foundation in truth. The story is based on comments made by Luther's collaborator Philip Melanchthon, though it is thought that he was not in Wittenberg at the time. According to Roland Bainton, on the other hand, it is true.

The Latin Theses were printed in several locations in Germany in 1517. In January 1518 friends of Luther translated the Ninety-five Theses from Latin into German. Within two weeks, copies of the theses had spread throughout Germany. Luther's writings circulated widely, reaching France, England, and Italy as early as 1519. Students thronged to Wittenberg to hear Luther speak. He published a short commentary on Galatians and his Work on the Psalms. This early part of Luther's career was one of his most creative and productive. Three of his best-known works were published in 1520: To the Christian Nobility of the German Nation, On the Babylonian Captivity of the Church, and On the Freedom of a Christian.

Justification by faith alone

From 1510 to 1520, Luther lectured on the Psalms, and on the books of Hebrews, Romans, and Galatians. As he studied these portions of the Bible, he came to view the use of terms such as penance and righteousness by the Catholic Church in new ways. He became convinced that the church was corrupt in its ways and had lost sight of what he saw as several of the central truths of Christianity. The most important for Luther was the doctrine of justification—God's act of declaring a sinner righteous—by faith alone through God's grace. He began to teach that salvation or redemption is a gift of God's grace, attainable only through faith in Jesus as the Messiah. "This one and firm rock, which we call the doctrine of justification", he writes, "is the chief article of the whole Christian doctrine, which comprehends the understanding of all godliness."

Luther came to understand justification as entirely the work of God. This teaching by Luther was clearly expressed in his 1525 publication On the Bondage of the Will, which was written in response to On Free Will by Desiderius Erasmus (1524).

"That is why faith alone makes someone just and fulfills the law," he writes. "Faith is that which brings the Holy Spirit through the merits of Christ." Faith, for Luther, was a gift from God; the experience of being justified by faith was "as though I had been born again." His entry into Paradise, no less, was a discovery about "the righteousness of God"—a discovery that "the just person" of whom the Bible speaks (as in Romans 1:17) lives by faith. He explains his concept of "justification" in the Smalcald Articles:

The first and chief article is this: Jesus Christ, our God and Lord, died for our sins and was raised again for our justification (Romans 3:24–25). He alone is the Lamb of God who takes away the sins of the world (John 1:29), and God has laid on Him the iniquity of us all (Isaiah 53:6). All have sinned and are justified freely, without their own works and merits, by His grace, through the redemption that is in Christ Jesus, in His blood (Romans 3:23–25). This is necessary to believe. This cannot be otherwise acquired or grasped by any work, law or merit. Therefore, it is clear and certain that this faith alone justifies us ... Nothing of this article can be yielded or surrendered, even though heaven and earth and everything else falls (Mark 13:31).

Breach with the papacy

Archbishop Albrecht did not reply to Luther's letter containing the Ninety-five Theses. He had the theses checked for heresy and in December 1517 forwarded them to Rome. He needed the revenue from the indulgences to pay off a papal dispensation for his tenure of more than one bishopric. As Luther later notes, "the pope had a finger in the pie as well, because one half was to go to the building of St. Peter's Church in Rome".

Pope Leo X was used to reformers and heretics, and he responded slowly, "with great care as is proper." Over the next three years he deployed a series of papal theologians and envoys against Luther, which served only to harden the reformer's anti-papal theology. First, the Dominican theologian Sylvester Mazzolini drafted a heresy case against Luther, whom Leo then summoned to Rome. The Elector Frederick persuaded the pope to have Luther examined at Augsburg, where the Imperial Diet was held. Over a three-day period in October 1518, Luther defended himself under questioning by papal legate Cardinal Cajetan. The pope's right to issue indulgences was at the centre of the dispute between the two men. The hearings degenerated into a shouting match. More than writing his theses, Luther's confrontation with the church cast him as an enemy of the pope: "His Holiness abuses Scripture", retorted Luther. "I deny that he is above Scripture". Cajetan's original instructions had been to arrest Luther if he failed to recant, but the legate desisted from doing so. With help from the Carmelite monk Christoph Langenmantel, Luther slipped out of the city at night, unbeknownst to Cajetan.

In January 1519, at Altenburg in Saxony, the papal nuncio Karl von Miltitz adopted a more conciliatory approach. Luther made certain concessions to the Saxon, who was a relative of the Elector and promised to remain silent if his opponents did. The theologian Johann Eck, however, was determined to expose Luther's doctrine in a public forum. In June and July 1519, he staged a disputation with Luther's colleague Andreas Karlstadt at Leipzig and invited Luther to speak. Luther's boldest assertion in the debate was that  does not confer on popes the exclusive right to interpret scripture, and that therefore neither popes nor church councils were infallible. For this, Eck branded Luther a new Jan Hus, referring to the Czech reformer and heretic burned at the stake in 1415. From that moment, he devoted himself to Luther's defeat.

Excommunication
On 15 June 1520, the Pope warned Luther with the papal bull (edict) Exsurge Domine that he risked excommunication unless he recanted 41 sentences drawn from his writings, including the Ninety-five Theses, within 60 days. That autumn, Eck proclaimed the bull in Meissen and other towns. Von Miltitz attempted to broker a solution, but Luther, who had sent the pope a copy of On the Freedom of a Christian in October, publicly set fire to the bull and decretals at Wittenberg on 10 December 1520, an act he defended in Why the Pope and his Recent Book are Burned and Assertions Concerning All Articles. As a consequence, Luther was excommunicated by Pope  on 3 January 1521, in the bull Decet Romanum Pontificem. And although the Lutheran World Federation, Methodists and the Catholic Church's Pontifical Council for Promoting Christian Unity agreed (in 1999 and 2006, respectively) on a "common understanding of justification by God's grace through faith in Christ," the Catholic Church has never lifted the 1521 excommunication.

Diet of Worms

The enforcement of the ban on the Ninety-five Theses fell to the secular authorities. On 18 April 1521, Luther appeared as ordered before the Diet of Worms. This was a general assembly of the estates of the Holy Roman Empire that took place in Worms, a town on the Rhine. It was conducted from 28 January to 25 May 1521, with Emperor Charles V presiding. Prince Frederick III, Elector of Saxony, obtained a safe conduct for Luther to and from the meeting.

Johann Eck, speaking on behalf of the empire as assistant of the Archbishop of Trier, presented Luther with copies of his writings laid out on a table and asked him if the books were his and whether he stood by their contents. Luther confirmed he was their author but requested time to think about the answer to the second question. He prayed, consulted friends, and gave his response the next day:

Unless I am convinced by the testimony of the Scriptures or by clear reason (for I do not trust either in the pope or in councils alone, since it is well known that they have often erred and contradicted themselves), I am bound by the Scriptures I have quoted and my conscience is captive to the Word of God. I cannot and will not recant anything, since it is neither safe nor right to go against conscience. May God help me. Amen.

At the end of this speech, Luther raised his arm "in the traditional salute of a knight winning a bout." Michael Mullett considers this speech as a "world classic of epoch-making oratory."

Eck informed Luther that he was acting like a heretic, saying,
Martin, there is no one of the heresies which have torn the bosom of the church, which has not derived its origin from the various interpretation of the Scripture. The Bible itself is the arsenal whence each innovator has drawn his deceptive arguments. It was with Biblical texts that Pelagius and Arius maintained their doctrines. Arius, for instance, found the negation of the eternity of the Word—an eternity which you admit, in this verse of the New Testament—Joseph knew not his wife till she had brought forth her first-born son; and he said, in the same way that you say, that this passage enchained him. When the fathers of the Council of Constance condemned this proposition of Jan Hus—The church of Jesus Christ is only the community of the elect, they condemned an error; for the church, like a good mother, embraces within her arms all who bear the name of Christian, all who are called to enjoy the celestial beatitude.

Luther refused to recant his writings. He is sometimes also quoted as saying: "Here I stand. I can do no other". Recent scholars consider the evidence for these words to be unreliable since they were inserted before "May God help me" only in later versions of the speech and not recorded in witness accounts of the proceedings. However, Mullett suggests that given his nature, "we are free to believe that Luther would tend to select the more dramatic form of words."

Over the next five days, private conferences were held to determine Luther's fate. The emperor presented the final draft of the Edict of Worms on 25 May 1521, declaring Luther an outlaw, banning his literature, and requiring his arrest: "We want him to be apprehended and punished as a notorious heretic." It also made it a crime for anyone in Germany to give Luther food or shelter. It permitted anyone to kill Luther without legal consequence.

At Wartburg Castle

Luther's disappearance during his return to Wittenberg was planned.  had him intercepted on his way home in the forest near Wittenberg by masked horsemen impersonating highway robbers. They escorted Luther to the security of the Wartburg Castle at Eisenach. During his stay at Wartburg, which he referred to as "my Patmos", Luther translated the New Testament from Greek into German and poured out doctrinal and polemical writings. These included a renewed attack on Archbishop Albrecht of Mainz, whom he shamed into halting the sale of indulgences in his episcopates, and a Refutation of the Argument of Latomus, in which he expounded the principle of justification to Jacobus Latomus, an orthodox theologian from Louvain. In this work, one of his most emphatic statements on faith, he argued that every good work designed to attract God's favor is a sin. All humans are sinners by nature, he explained, and God's grace alone (which cannot be earned) can make them just. On 1 August 1521, Luther wrote to Melanchthon on the same theme: "Be a sinner, and let your sins be strong, but let your trust in Christ be stronger, and rejoice in Christ who is the victor over sin, death, and the world. We will commit sins while we are here, for this life is not a place where justice resides."

In the summer of 1521, Luther widened his target from individual pieties like indulgences and pilgrimages to doctrines at the heart of Church practice. In On the Abrogation of the Private Mass, he condemned as idolatry the idea that the mass is a sacrifice, asserting instead that it is a gift, to be received with thanksgiving by the whole congregation. His essay On Confession, Whether the Pope has the Power to Require It rejected compulsory confession and encouraged private confession and absolution, since "every Christian is a confessor." In November, Luther wrote The Judgement of Martin Luther on Monastic Vows. He assured monks and nuns that they could break their vows without sin, because vows were an illegitimate and vain attempt to win salvation.

Luther made his pronouncements from Wartburg in the context of rapid developments at Wittenberg, of which he was kept fully informed. Andreas Karlstadt, supported by the ex-Augustinian Gabriel Zwilling, embarked on a radical programme of reform there in June 1521, exceeding anything envisaged by Luther. The reforms provoked disturbances, including a revolt by the Augustinian friars against their prior, the smashing of statues and images in churches, and denunciations of the magistracy. After secretly visiting Wittenberg in early December 1521, Luther wrote A Sincere Admonition by Martin Luther to All Christians to Guard Against Insurrection and Rebellion. Wittenberg became even more volatile after Christmas when a band of visionary zealots, the so-called Zwickau prophets, arrived, preaching revolutionary doctrines such as the equality of man, adult baptism, and Christ's imminent return. When the town council asked Luther to return, he decided it was his duty to act.

Return to Wittenberg and Peasants' War

Luther secretly returned to Wittenberg on 6 March 1522. He wrote to the Elector: "During my absence, Satan has entered my sheepfold, and committed ravages which I cannot repair by writing, but only by my personal presence and living word." For eight days in Lent, beginning on Invocavit Sunday, 9 March, Luther preached eight sermons, which became known as the "Invocavit Sermons". In these sermons, he hammered home the primacy of core Christian values such as love, patience, charity, and freedom, and reminded the citizens to trust God's word rather than violence to bring about necessary change.

Do you know what the Devil thinks when he sees men use violence to propagate the gospel? He sits with folded arms behind the fire of hell, and says with malignant looks and frightful grin: "Ah, how wise these madmen are to play my game! Let them go on; I shall reap the benefit. I delight in it." But when he sees the Word running and contending alone on the battle-field, then he shudders and shakes for fear.

The effect of Luther's intervention was immediate. After the sixth sermon, the Wittenberg jurist Jerome Schurf wrote to the elector: "Oh, what joy has Dr. Martin's return spread among us! His words, through divine mercy, are bringing back every day misguided people into the way of the truth."

Luther next set about reversing or modifying the new church practices. By working alongside the authorities to restore public order, he signalled his reinvention as a conservative force within the Reformation. After banishing the Zwickau prophets, he faced a battle against both the established Church and the radical reformers who threatened the new order by fomenting social unrest and violence.

Despite his victory in Wittenberg, Luther was unable to stifle radicalism further afield. Preachers such as Thomas Müntzer and Zwickau prophet Nicholas Storch found support amongst poorer townspeople and peasants between 1521 and 1525. There had been revolts by the peasantry on smaller scales since the 15th century. Luther's pamphlets against the Church and the hierarchy, often worded with "liberal" phraseology, led many peasants to believe he would support an attack on the upper classes in general. Revolts broke out in Franconia, Swabia, and Thuringia in 1524, even drawing support from disaffected nobles, many of whom were in debt. Gaining momentum under the leadership of radicals such as Müntzer in Thuringia, and Hipler and Lotzer in the south-west, the revolts turned into war.

Luther sympathised with some of the peasants' grievances, as he showed in his response to the Twelve Articles in May 1525, but he reminded the aggrieved to obey the temporal authorities. During a tour of Thuringia, he became enraged at the widespread burning of convents, monasteries, bishops' palaces, and libraries. In Against the Murderous, Thieving Hordes of Peasants, written on his return to Wittenberg, he gave his interpretation of the Gospel teaching on wealth, condemned the violence as the devil's work, and called for the nobles to put down the rebels like mad dogs:

Therefore let everyone who can, smite, slay, and stab, secretly or openly, remembering that nothing can be more poisonous, hurtful, or devilish than a rebel ... For baptism does not make men free in body and property, but in soul; and the gospel does not make goods common, except in the case of those who, of their own free will, do what the apostles and disciples did in Acts 4 [:32–37]. They did not demand, as do our insane peasants in their raging, that the goods of others—of Pilate and Herod—should be common, but only their own goods. Our peasants, however, want to make the goods of other men common, and keep their own for themselves. Fine Christians they are! I think there is not a devil left in hell; they have all gone into the peasants. Their raving has gone beyond all measure.

Luther justified his opposition to the rebels on three grounds. First, in choosing violence over lawful submission to the secular government, they were ignoring Christ's counsel to "Render unto Caesar the things that are Caesar's"; St. Paul had written in his epistle to the  that all authorities are appointed by God and therefore should not be resisted. This reference from the Bible forms the foundation for the doctrine known as the divine right of kings, or, in the German case, the divine right of the princes. Second, the violent actions of rebelling, robbing, and plundering placed the peasants "outside the law of God and Empire", so they deserved "death in body and soul, if only as highwaymen and murderers." Lastly, Luther charged the rebels with blasphemy for calling themselves "Christian brethren" and committing their sinful acts under the banner of the Gospel. Only later in life did he develop the Beerwolf concept permitting some cases of resistance against the government.

Without Luther's backing for the uprising, many rebels laid down their weapons; others felt betrayed. Their defeat by the Swabian League at the Battle of Frankenhausen on 15 May 1525, followed by Müntzer's execution, brought the revolutionary stage of the Reformation to a close. Thereafter, radicalism found a refuge in the Anabaptist movement and other religious movements, while Luther's Reformation flourished under the wing of the secular powers. In 1526 Luther wrote: "I, Martin Luther, have during the rebellion slain all the peasants, for it was I who ordered them to be struck dead."

Marriage

Martin Luther married Katharina von Bora, one of 12 nuns he had helped escape from the Nimbschen Cistercian convent in April 1523, when he arranged for them to be smuggled out in herring barrels. "Suddenly, and while I was occupied with far different thoughts," he wrote to Wenceslaus Link, "the Lord has plunged me into marriage." At the time of their marriage, Katharina was 26 years old and Luther was 41 years old.

On 13 June 1525, the couple was engaged, with Johannes Bugenhagen, Justus Jonas, Johannes Apel, Philipp Melanchthon and Lucas Cranach the Elder and his wife as witnesses. On the evening of the same day, the couple was married by Bugenhagen. The ceremonial walk to the church and the wedding banquet were left out and were made up two weeks later on 27 June.

Some priests and former members of religious orders had already married, including Andreas Karlstadt and Justus Jonas, but Luther's wedding set the seal of approval on clerical marriage. He had long condemned vows of celibacy on biblical grounds, but his decision to marry surprised many, not least Melanchthon, who called it reckless. Luther had written to George Spalatin on 30 November 1524, "I shall never take a wife, as I feel at present. Not that I am insensible to my flesh or sex (for I am neither wood nor stone); but my mind is averse to wedlock because I daily expect the death of a heretic."
Before marrying, Luther had been living on the plainest food, and, as he admitted himself, his mildewed bed was not properly made for months at a time.

Luther and his wife moved into a former monastery, "The Black Cloister," a wedding present from Elector John the Steadfast. They embarked on what appears to have been a happy and successful marriage, though money was often short. Katharina bore six children: Hans – June 1526; Elisabeth – 10 December 1527, who died within a few months; Magdalene – 1529, who died in Luther's arms in 1542; Martin – 1531; Paul – January 1533; and Margaret – 1534; and she helped the couple earn a living by farming and taking in boarders. Luther confided to Michael Stiefel on 11 August 1526: "My Katie is in all things so obliging and pleasing to me that I would not exchange my poverty for the riches of Croesus."

Organising the church

By 1526, Luther found himself increasingly occupied in organising a new church. His biblical ideal of congregations choosing their own ministers had proved unworkable. According to Bainton: "Luther's dilemma was that he wanted both a confessional church based on personal faith and experience and a territorial church including all in a given locality. If he were forced to choose, he would take his stand with the masses, and this was the direction in which he moved."

From 1525 to 1529, he established a supervisory church body, laid down a new form of worship service, and wrote a clear summary of the new faith in the form of two catechisms. To avoid confusing or upsetting the people, Luther avoided extreme change. He also did not wish to replace one controlling system with another. He concentrated on the church in the Electorate of Saxony, acting only as an adviser to churches in new territories, many of which followed his Saxon model. He worked closely with the new elector, John the Steadfast, to whom he turned for secular leadership and funds on behalf of a church largely shorn of its assets and income after the break with Rome. For Luther's biographer Martin Brecht, this partnership "was the beginning of a questionable and originally unintended development towards a church government under the temporal sovereign".

The elector authorised a visitation of the church, a power formerly exercised by bishops. At times, Luther's practical reforms fell short of his earlier radical pronouncements. For example, the Instructions for the Visitors of Parish Pastors in Electoral Saxony (1528), drafted by Melanchthon with Luther's approval, stressed the role of repentance in the forgiveness of sins, despite Luther's position that faith alone ensures justification. The Eisleben reformer Johannes Agricola challenged this compromise, and Luther condemned him for teaching that faith is separate from works. The Instruction is a problematic document for those seeking a consistent evolution in Luther's thought and practice.

In response to demands for a German liturgy, Luther wrote a German Mass, which he published in early 1526. He did not intend it as a replacement for his 1523 adaptation of the Latin Mass but as an alternative for the "simple people", a "public stimulation for people to believe and become Christians." Luther based his order on the Catholic service but omitted "everything that smacks of sacrifice", and the Mass became a celebration where everyone received the wine as well as the bread. He retained the elevation of the host and chalice, while trappings such as the Mass vestments, altar, and candles were made optional, allowing freedom of ceremony. Some reformers, including followers of Huldrych Zwingli, considered Luther's service too papistic, and modern scholars note the conservatism of his alternative to the Catholic Mass. Luther's service, however, included congregational singing of hymns and psalms in German, as well as parts of the liturgy, including Luther's unison setting of the Creed. To reach the simple people and the young, Luther incorporated religious instruction into the weekday services in the form of catechism. He also provided simplified versions of the baptism and marriage services.

Luther and his colleagues introduced the new order of worship during their visitation of the Electorate of Saxony, which began in 1527. They also assessed the standard of pastoral care and Christian education in the territory. "Merciful God, what misery I have seen," Luther writes, "the common people knowing nothing at all of Christian doctrine ... and unfortunately many pastors are well-nigh unskilled and incapable of teaching."

Catechisms

Luther devised the catechism as a method of imparting the basics of Christianity to the congregations. In 1529, he wrote the Large Catechism, a manual for pastors and teachers, as well as a synopsis, the Small Catechism, to be memorised by the people. The catechisms provided easy-to-understand instructional and devotional material on the Ten Commandments, the Apostles' Creed, The Lord's Prayer, baptism, and the Lord's Supper. Luther incorporated questions and answers in the catechism so that the basics of Christian faith would not just be learned by rote, "the way monkeys do it", but understood.

The catechism is one of Luther's most personal works. "Regarding the plan to collect my writings in volumes," he wrote, "I am quite cool and not at all eager about it because, roused by a Saturnian hunger, I would rather see them all devoured. For I acknowledge none of them to be really a book of mine, except perhaps the Bondage of the Will and the Catechism." The Small Catechism has earned a reputation as a model of clear religious teaching. It remains in use today, along with Luther's hymns and his translation of the Bible.

Luther's Small Catechism proved especially effective in helping parents teach their children; likewise the Large Catechism was effective for pastors. Using the German vernacular, they expressed the Apostles' Creed in simpler, more personal, Trinitarian language. He rewrote each article of the Creed to express the character of the Father, the Son, or the Holy Spirit. Luther's goal was to enable the catechumens to see themselves as a personal object of the work of the three persons of the Trinity, each of which works in the catechumen's life. That is, Luther depicts the Trinity not as a doctrine to be learned, but as persons to be known. The Father creates, the Son redeems, and the Spirit sanctifies, a divine unity with separate personalities. Salvation originates with the Father and draws the believer to the Father. Luther's treatment of the Apostles' Creed must be understood in the context of the Decalogue (the Ten Commandments) and The Lord's Prayer, which are also part of the Lutheran catechetical teaching.

Translation of the Bible

Luther had published his German translation of the New Testament in 1522, and he and his collaborators completed the translation of the Old Testament in 1534, when the whole Bible was published. He continued to work on refining the translation until the end of his life. Others had previously translated the Bible into German, but Luther tailored his translation to his own doctrine.
Two of the earlier translations were the Mentelin Bible (1456) and the Koberger Bible (1484). There were as many as fourteen in High German, four in Low German, four in Dutch, and various other translations in other languages before the Bible of Luther.

Luther's translation used the variant of German spoken at the Saxon chancellery, intelligible to both northern and southern Germans. He intended his vigorous, direct language to make the Bible accessible to everyday Germans, "for we are removing impediments and difficulties so that other people may read it without hindrance." Published at a time of rising demand for German-language publications, Luther's version quickly became a popular and influential Bible translation. As such, it contributed a distinct flavor to the German language and literature. Furnished with notes and prefaces by Luther, and with woodcuts by Lucas Cranach that contained anti-papal imagery, it played a major role in the spread of Luther's doctrine throughout Germany. The Luther Bible influenced other vernacular translations, such as the Tyndale Bible (from 1525 forward), a precursor of the King James Bible.

For in that very passage he is dealing with the main point of Christian doctrine, namely, that we are justified by faith in Christ without any works of the Law. ... But when works are so completely cut away—and that must mean that faith alone justifies—whoever would speak plainly and clearly about this cutting away of works will have to say, 'Faith alone justifies us, and not works'." Luther did not include First Epistle of John , the Johannine Comma in his translation, rejecting it as a forgery. It was inserted into the text by other hands after Luther's death.

Hymnodist

Luther was a prolific hymnodist, authoring hymns such as "Ein feste Burg ist unser Gott" ("A Mighty Fortress Is Our God"), based on Psalm 46, and "Vom Himmel hoch, da komm ich her" ("From Heaven Above to Earth I Come"), based on Luke 2:11–12. Luther connected high art and folk music, also all classes, clergy and laity, men, women and children. His tool of choice for this connection was the singing of German hymns in connection with worship, school, home, and the public arena. He often accompanied the sung hymns with a lute, later recreated as the waldzither that became a national instrument of Germany in the 20th century.

Luther's hymns were frequently evoked by particular events in his life and the unfolding Reformation. This behavior started with his learning of the execution of Jan van Essen and Hendrik Vos, the first individuals to be martyred by the Roman Catholic Church for Lutheran views, prompting Luther to write the hymn "Ein neues Lied wir heben an" ("A New Song We Raise"), which is generally known in English by John C. Messenger's translation by the title and first line "Flung to the Heedless Winds" and sung to the tune Ibstone composed in 1875 by Maria C. Tiddeman.

Luther's 1524 creedal hymn "" ("We All Believe in One True God") is a three-stanza confession of faith prefiguring Luther's 1529 three-part explanation of the Apostles' Creed in the Small Catechism. Luther's hymn, adapted and expanded from an earlier German creedal hymn, gained widespread use in vernacular Lutheran liturgies as early as 1525. Sixteenth-century Lutheran hymnals also included "Wir glauben all" among the catechetical hymns, although 18th-century hymnals tended to label the hymn as Trinitarian rather than catechetical, and 20th-century Lutherans rarely used the hymn because of the perceived difficulty of its tune.

Luther's 1538 hymnic version of the Lord's Prayer, "Vater unser im Himmelreich", corresponds exactly to Luther's explanation of the prayer in the Small Catechism, with one stanza for each of the seven prayer petitions, plus opening and closing stanzas. The hymn functions both as a liturgical setting of the Lord's Prayer and as a means of examining candidates on specific catechism questions. The extant manuscript shows multiple revisions, demonstrating Luther's concern to clarify and strengthen the text and to provide an appropriately prayerful tune. Other 16th- and 20th-century versifications of the Lord's Prayer have adopted Luther's tune, although modern texts are considerably shorter.

Luther wrote "Aus tiefer Not schrei ich zu dir" ("From depths of woe I cry to You") in 1523 as a hymnic version of Psalm 130 and sent it as a sample to encourage his colleagues to write psalm-hymns for use in German worship. In a collaboration with Paul Speratus, this and seven other hymns were published in the Achtliederbuch, the first Lutheran hymnal. In 1524 Luther developed his original four-stanza psalm paraphrase into a five-stanza Reformation hymn that developed the theme of "grace alone" more fully. Because it expressed essential Reformation doctrine, this expanded version of "Aus tiefer Not" was designated as a regular component of several regional Lutheran liturgies and was widely used at funerals, including Luther's own. Along with Erhart Hegenwalt's hymnic version of Psalm 51, Luther's expanded hymn was also adopted for use with the fifth part of Luther's catechism, concerning confession.

Luther wrote "Ach Gott, vom Himmel sieh darein" ("Oh God, look down from heaven"). "Nun komm, der Heiden Heiland" (Now come, Savior of the gentiles), based on Veni redemptor gentium, became the main hymn (Hauptlied) for Advent. He transformed A solus ortus cardine to "" ("We should now praise Christ") and Veni Creator Spiritus to "" ("Come, Holy Spirit, Lord God"). He wrote two hymns on the Ten Commandments, "" and "Mensch, willst du leben seliglich". His "Gelobet seist du, Jesu Christ" ("Praise be to You, Jesus Christ") became the main hymn for Christmas. He wrote for Pentecost "Nun bitten wir den Heiligen Geist", and adopted for Easter "" (Christ is risen), based on Victimae paschali laudes. "", a paraphrase of Nunc dimittis, was intended for Purification, but became also a funeral hymn. He paraphrased the Te Deum as "Herr Gott, dich loben wir" with a simplified form of the melody. It became known as the German Te Deum.

Luther's 1541 hymn "" ("To Jordan came the Christ our Lord") reflects the structure and substance of his questions and answers concerning baptism in the Small Catechism. Luther adopted a preexisting Johann Walter tune associated with a hymnic setting of Psalm 67's prayer for grace; Wolf Heintz's four-part setting of the hymn was used to introduce the Lutheran Reformation in Halle in 1541. Preachers and composers of the 18th century, including J.S. Bach, used this rich hymn as a subject for their own work, although its objective baptismal theology was displaced by more subjective hymns under the influence of late-19th-century Lutheran pietism.

Luther's hymns were included in early Lutheran hymnals and spread the ideas of the Reformation. He supplied four of eight songs of the First Lutheran hymnal Achtliederbuch, 18 of 26 songs of the Erfurt Enchiridion, and 24 of the 32 songs in the first choral hymnal with settings by Johann Walter, Eyn geystlich Gesangk Buchleyn, all published in 1524. Luther's hymns inspired composers to write music. Johann Sebastian Bach included several verses as chorales in his cantatas and based chorale cantatas entirely on them, namely Christ lag in Todes Banden, BWV 4, as early as possibly 1707, in his second annual cycle (1724 to 1725) Ach Gott, vom Himmel sieh darein, BWV 2, Christ unser Herr zum Jordan kam, BWV 7, Nun komm, der Heiden Heiland, BWV 62, Gelobet seist du, Jesu Christ, BWV 91, and Aus tiefer Not schrei ich zu dir, BWV 38, later Ein feste Burg ist unser Gott, BWV 80, and in 1735 Wär Gott nicht mit uns diese Zeit, BWV 14.

On the soul after death

In contrast to the views of John Calvin and Philipp Melanchthon, throughout his life Luther maintained that it was not false doctrine to believe that a Christian's soul sleeps after it is separated from the body in death. Accordingly, he disputed traditional interpretations of some Bible passages, such as the parable of the rich man and Lazarus. This also led Luther to reject the idea of torments for the saints: "It is enough for us to know that souls do not leave their bodies to be threatened by the torments and punishments of hell, but enter a prepared bedchamber in which they sleep in peace." He also rejected the existence of purgatory, which involved Christian souls undergoing penitential suffering after death. He affirmed the continuity of one's personal identity beyond death. In his Smalcald Articles, he described the saints as currently residing "in their graves and in heaven."

The Lutheran theologian Franz Pieper observes that Luther's teaching about the state of the Christian's soul after death differed from the later Lutheran theologians such as Johann Gerhard. Lessing (1755) had earlier reached the same conclusion in his analysis of Lutheran orthodoxy on this issue.

Luther's Commentary on Genesis contains a passage which concludes that "the soul does not sleep (anima non sic dormit), but wakes (sed vigilat) and experiences visions". Francis Blackburne argues that John Jortin misread this and other passages from Luther, while Gottfried Fritschel points out that it actually refers to the soul of a man "in this life" (homo enim in hac vita) tired from his daily labour (defatigus diurno labore) who at night enters his bedchamber (sub noctem intrat in cubiculum suum) and whose sleep is interrupted by dreams.

Henry Eyster Jacobs' English translation from 1898 reads:
"Nevertheless, the sleep of this life and that of the future life differ; for in this life, man, fatigued by his daily labour, at nightfall goes to his couch, as in peace, to sleep there, and enjoys rest; nor does he know anything of evil, whether of fire or of murder."

Sacramentarian controversy and the Marburg Colloquy

In October 1529, Philip I, Landgrave of Hesse, convoked an assembly of German and Swiss theologians at the Marburg Colloquy, to establish doctrinal unity in the emerging Protestant states. Agreement was achieved on fourteen points out of fifteen, the exception being the nature of the Eucharist—the sacrament of the Lord's Supper—an issue crucial to Luther. The theologians, including Zwingli, Melanchthon, Martin Bucer, and Johannes Oecolampadius, differed on the significance of the words spoken by Jesus at the Last Supper: "This is my body which is for you" and "This cup is the new covenant in my blood" (1 Corinthians 11:23–26). Luther insisted on the Real presence of the body and blood of Christ in the consecrated bread and wine, which he called the sacramental union, while his opponents believed God to be only spiritually or symbolically present.

Zwingli, for example, denied Jesus' ability to be in more than one place at a time. Luther stressed the omnipresence of Jesus' human nature. According to transcripts, the debate sometimes became confrontational. Citing Jesus' words "The flesh profiteth nothing" (John 6.63), Zwingli said, "This passage breaks your neck". "Don't be too proud," Luther retorted, "German necks don't break that easily. This is Hesse, not Switzerland." On his table Luther wrote the words "Hoc est corpus meum" ("This is my body") in chalk, to continually indicate his firm stance.

Despite the disagreements on the Eucharist, the Marburg Colloquy paved the way for the signing in 1530 of the Augsburg Confession, and for the formation of the Schmalkaldic League the following year by leading Protestant nobles such as John of Saxony, Philip of Hesse, and George, Margrave of Brandenburg-Ansbach. The Swiss cities, however, did not sign these agreements.

Epistemology
Some scholars have asserted that Luther taught that faith and reason were antithetical in the sense that questions of faith could not be illuminated by reason. He wrote, "All the articles of our Christian faith, which God has revealed to us in His Word, are in presence of reason sheerly impossible, absurd, and false." and "[That] Reason in no way contributes to faith. [...] For reason is the greatest enemy that faith has; it never comes to the aid of spiritual things." However, though seemingly contradictorily, he also wrote in the latter work that human reason "strives not against faith, when enlightened, but rather furthers and advances it", bringing claims he was a fideist into dispute. Contemporary Lutheran scholarship, however, has found a different reality in Luther. Luther rather seeks to separate faith and reason in order to honor the separate spheres of knowledge that each applies to.

On Islam

At the time of the Marburg Colloquy, Suleiman the Magnificent was besieging Vienna with a vast Ottoman army. Luther had argued against resisting the Turks in his 1518 Explanation of the Ninety-five Theses, provoking accusations of defeatism. He saw the Turks as a scourge sent by God to punish Christians, as agents of the biblical apocalypse that would destroy the Antichrist, whom Luther believed to be the papacy and the Roman Church. He consistently rejected the idea of a Holy War, "as though our people were an army of Christians against the Turks, who were enemies of Christ. This is absolutely contrary to Christ's doctrine and name". On the other hand, in keeping with his doctrine of the two kingdoms, Luther did support non-religious war against the Turks. In 1526, he argued in Whether Soldiers can be in a State of Grace that national defence is reason for a just war. By 1529, in On War against the Turk, he was actively urging Emperor Charles V and the German people to fight a secular war against the Turks.
He made clear, however, that the spiritual war against an alien faith was separate, to be waged through prayer and repentance. Around the time of the Siege of Vienna, Luther wrote a prayer for national deliverance from the Turks, asking God to "give to our emperor perpetual victory over our enemies".

In 1542, Luther read a Latin translation of the Qur'an. He went on to produce several critical pamphlets on Islam, which he called "Mohammedanism" or "the Turk". Though Luther saw the Muslim faith as a tool of the devil, he was indifferent to its practice: "Let the Turk believe and live as he will, just as one lets the papacy and other false Christians live." He opposed banning the publication of the Qur'an, wanting it exposed to scrutiny.

Antinomian controversy

Early in 1537, Johannes Agricola—serving at the time as pastor in Luther's birthplace, Eisleben—preached a sermon in which he claimed that God's gospel, not God's moral law (the Ten Commandments), revealed God's wrath to Christians. Based on this sermon and others by Agricola, Luther suspected that Agricola was behind certain anonymous antinomian theses circulating in Wittenberg. These theses asserted that the law is no longer to be taught to Christians but belonged only to city hall. Luther responded to these theses with six series of theses against Agricola and the antinomians, four of which became the basis for disputations between 1538 and 1540. He also responded to these assertions in other writings, such as his 1539 open letter to C. Güttel Against the Antinomians, and his book On the Councils and the Church from the same year.

In his theses and disputations against the antinomians, Luther reviews and reaffirms, on the one hand, what has been called the "second use of the law," that is, the law as the Holy Spirit's tool to work sorrow over sin in man's heart, thus preparing him for Christ's fulfillment of the law offered in the gospel. Luther states that everything that is used to work sorrow over sin is called the law, even if it is Christ's life, Christ's death for sin, or God's goodness experienced in creation. Simply refusing to preach the Ten Commandments among Christians—thereby, as it were, removing the three letters l-a-w from the church—does not eliminate the accusing law. Claiming that the law—in any form—should not be preached to Christians anymore would be tantamount to asserting that Christians are no longer sinners in themselves and that the church consists only of essentially holy people.

Luther also points out that the Ten Commandments—when considered not as God's condemning judgment but as an expression of his eternal will, that is, of the natural law—positively teach how the Christian ought to live. This has traditionally been called the "third use of the law." For Luther, also Christ's life, when understood as an example, is nothing more than an illustration of the Ten Commandments, which a Christian should follow in his or her vocations on a daily basis.

The Ten Commandments, and the beginnings of the renewed life of Christians accorded to them by the sacrament of baptism, are a present foreshadowing of the believers' future angel-like life in heaven in the midst of this life. Luther's teaching of the Ten Commandments, therefore, has clear eschatological overtones, which, characteristically for Luther, do not encourage world-flight but direct the Christian to service to the neighbor in the common, daily vocations of this perishing world.

Bigamy of Philip I, Landgrave of Hesse
From December 1539, Luther became involved in the designs of Philip I, Landgrave of Hesse to marry a lady-in-waiting of his wife, Christine of Saxony. Philip solicited the approval of Luther, Melanchthon, and Bucer, citing as a precedent the polygamy of the patriarchs. The theologians were not prepared to make a general ruling, and they reluctantly advised the landgrave that if he was determined, he should marry secretly and keep quiet about the matter because divorce was worse than bigamy. As a result, on 4 March 1540, Philip married a second wife, Margarethe von der Saale, with Melanchthon and Bucer among the witnesses. However, Philip's sister Elisabeth quickly made the scandal public, and Philip threatened to expose Luther's advice. Luther told him to "tell a good, strong lie" and deny the marriage completely, which Philip did. Margarethe gave birth to nine children over a span of 17 years, giving Philip a total of 19 children. In the view of Luther's biographer Martin Brecht, "giving confessional advice for Philip of Hesse was one of the worst mistakes Luther made, and, next to the landgrave himself, who was directly responsible for it, history chiefly holds Luther accountable". Brecht argues that Luther's mistake was not that he gave private pastoral advice, but that he miscalculated the political implications. The affair caused lasting damage to Luther's reputation.

Anti-Jewish polemics and antisemitism

Luther wrote negatively about the Jews throughout his career. Though Luther rarely encountered Jews during his life, his attitudes reflected a theological and cultural tradition which saw Jews as a rejected people guilty of the murder of Christ, and he lived in a locality which had expelled Jews some ninety years earlier. He considered the Jews blasphemers and liars because they rejected the divinity of Jesus. In 1523, Luther advised kindness toward the Jews in That Jesus Christ was Born a Jew and also aimed to convert them to Christianity. When his efforts at conversion failed, he grew increasingly bitter toward them.

Luther's major works on the Jews were his 60,000-word treatise Von den Juden und Ihren Lügen (On the Jews and Their Lies), and Vom Schem Hamphoras und vom Geschlecht Christi (On the Holy Name and the Lineage of Christ), both published in 1543, three years before his death. Luther argued that the Jews were no longer the chosen people but "the devil's people", and referred to them with violent language. Citing Deuteronomy 13, wherein Moses commands the killing of idolaters and the burning of their cities and property as an offering to God, Luther called for a "scharfe Barmherzigkeit" ("sharp mercy") against the Jews "to see whether we might save at least a few from the glowing flames." Luther advocated setting synagogues on fire, destroying Jewish prayerbooks, forbidding rabbis from preaching, seizing Jews' property and money, and smashing up their homes, so that these "envenomed worms" would be forced into labour or expelled "for all time". In Robert Michael's view, Luther's words "We are at fault in not slaying them" amounted to a sanction for murder. "God's anger with them is so intense," Luther concluded, "that gentle mercy will only tend to make them worse, while sharp mercy will reform them but little. Therefore, in any case, away with them!"

Luther launched a polemic against vagrants in his 1528 preface to Liber Vagatorum, saying that the Jews had contributed Hebrew words as a main basis of the Rotwelsch cryptolect. He warned in the admonitory preface Christians not to give them alms as it was, in his opinion, to forsake the truly poor.

Luther spoke out against the Jews in Saxony, Brandenburg, and Silesia. Josel of Rosheim, the Jewish spokesman who tried to help the Jews of Saxony in 1537, later blamed their plight on "that priest whose name was Martin Luther—may his body and soul be bound up in hell!—who wrote and issued many heretical books in which he said that whoever would help the Jews was doomed to perdition." Josel asked the city of Strasbourg to forbid the sale of Luther's anti-Jewish works: they refused initially but did so when a Lutheran pastor in Hochfelden used a sermon to urge his parishioners to murder Jews. Luther's influence persisted after his death. Throughout the 1580s, riots led to the expulsion of Jews from several German Lutheran states.

Tovia Singer, an Orthodox Jewish rabbi, remarking about Luther's attitude toward Jews, put it thus: "Among all the Church Fathers and Reformers, there was no mouth more vile, no tongue that uttered more vulgar curses against the Children of Israel than this founder of the Reformation."

Influence within Nazism 

Luther was the most widely read author of his generation, and within Germany he acquired the status of a prophet. According to the prevailing opinion among historians, his anti-Jewish rhetoric contributed significantly to the development of antisemitism in Germany, and in the 1930s and 1940s provided an "ideal underpinning" for the Nazis' attacks on Jews. Reinhold Lewin writes that anybody who "wrote against the Jews for whatever reason believed he had the right to justify himself by triumphantly referring to Luther." According to Michael, just about every anti-Jewish book printed in Nazi Germany contained references to and quotations from Luther. Heinrich Himmler (albeit never a Lutheran, having been brought up Catholic) wrote admiringly of his writings and sermons on the Jews in 1940. The city of Nuremberg presented a first edition of On the Jews and their Lies to Julius Streicher, editor of the Nazi newspaper Der Stürmer, on his birthday in 1937; the newspaper described it as the most radically antisemitic tract ever published. It was publicly exhibited in a glass case at the Nuremberg rallies and quoted in a 54-page explanation of the Aryan Law by E.H. Schulz and R. Frercks.

On 17 December 1941, seven Protestant regional church confederations issued a statement agreeing with the policy of forcing Jews to wear the yellow badge, "since after his bitter experience Luther had already suggested preventive measures against the Jews and their expulsion from German territory." According to Daniel Goldhagen, Bishop Martin Sasse, a leading Protestant churchman, published a compendium of Luther's writings shortly after Kristallnacht, for which Diarmaid MacCulloch, professor of the history of the church at the University of Oxford argued that Luther's writing was a "blueprint." Sasse applauded the burning of the synagogues and the coincidence of the day, writing in the introduction, "On 10 November 1938, on Luther's birthday, the synagogues are burning in Germany." The German people, he urged, ought to heed these words "of the greatest antisemite of his time, the warner of his people against the Jews."

At the heart of scholarly debate about Luther's influence is whether it is anachronistic to view his work as a precursor of the racial antisemitism of the Nazis. Some scholars see Luther's influence as limited, and the Nazis' use of his work as opportunistic. Johannes Wallmann argues that Luther's writings against the Jews were largely ignored in the 18th and 19th centuries, and that there was no continuity between Luther's thought and Nazi ideology. Uwe Siemon-Netto agreed, arguing that it was because the Nazis were already antisemites that they revived Luther's work. Hans J. Hillerbrand agreed that to focus on Luther was to adopt an essentially ahistorical perspective of Nazi antisemitism that ignored other contributory factors in German history. Similarly, Roland Bainton, noted church historian and Luther biographer, wrote "One could wish that Luther had died before ever [On the Jews and Their Lies] was written. His position was entirely religious and in no respect racial."
However, Christopher J. Probst, in his book Demonizing the Jews: Luther and the Protestant Church in Nazi Germany (2012), shows that a large number of German Protestant clergy and theologians during the Nazi era used Luther's hostile publications towards the Jews and their Jewish religion to justify at least in part the anti-Semitic policies of the National Socialists. The pro-Nazi Christian group Deutsche Christen drew parallels between Martin Luther and the "Führer" Adolf Hitler.

Some scholars, such as Mark U. Edwards in his book Luther's Last Battles: Politics and Polemics 1531–46 (1983), suggest that since Luther's increasingly antisemitic views developed during the years his health deteriorated, it is possible they were at least partly the product of a state of mind. Edwards also comments that Luther often deliberately used "vulgarity and violence" for effect, both in his writings condemning the Jews and in diatribes against "Turks" (Muslims) and Catholics.

Since the 1980s, Lutheran denominations have repudiated Martin Luther's statements against the Jews and have rejected the use of them to incite hatred against Lutherans. Strommen et al.'s 1970 survey of 4,745 North American Lutherans aged 15–65 found that, compared to the other minority groups under consideration, Lutherans were the least prejudiced toward Jews. Nevertheless, Professor Richard Geary, former professor of modern history at the University of Nottingham and the author of Hitler and Nazism (Routledge 1993), published an article in the magazine History Today examining electoral trends in Weimar Germany between 1928 and 1933. Geary notes that, based on his research, the Nazi Party received disproportionately more votes from Protestant than Catholic areas of Germany.

Final years, illness and death 

Luther had been suffering from ill health for years, including Ménière's disease, vertigo, fainting, tinnitus, and a cataract in one eye. From 1531 to 1546 his health deteriorated further.  In 1536, he began to suffer from kidney and bladder stones, arthritis, and an ear infection ruptured an ear drum. In December 1544, he began to feel the effects of angina.

His poor physical health made him short-tempered and even harsher in his writings and comments. His wife Katharina was overheard saying, "Dear husband, you are too rude," and he responded, "They are teaching me to be rude." In 1545 and 1546 Luther preached three times in the Market Church in Halle, staying with his friend Justus Jonas during Christmas.

His last sermon was delivered at Eisleben, his place of birth, on 15 February 1546, three days before his death. It was "entirely devoted to the obdurate Jews, whom it was a matter of great urgency to expel from all German territory," according to Léon Poliakov. James Mackinnon writes that it concluded with a "fiery summons to drive the Jews bag and baggage from their midst, unless they desisted from their calumny and their usury and became Christians." Luther said, "we want to practice Christian love toward them and pray that they convert," but also that they are "our public enemies ... and if they could kill us all, they would gladly do so. And so often they do."

Luther's final journey, to Mansfeld, was taken because of his concern for his siblings' families continuing in their father Hans Luther's copper mining trade. Their livelihood was threatened by Count Albrecht of Mansfeld bringing the industry under his own control. The controversy that ensued involved all four Mansfeld counts: Albrecht, Philip, John George, and Gerhard. Luther journeyed to Mansfeld twice in late 1545 to participate in the negotiations for a settlement, and a third visit was needed in early 1546 for their completion.

The negotiations were successfully concluded on 17 February 1546. After 8 p.m., he experienced chest pains. When he went to his bed, he prayed, "Into your hand I commit my spirit; you have redeemed me, O Lord, faithful God" (Ps. 31:5), the common prayer of the dying. At 1 a.m. on 18 February, he awoke with more chest pain and was warmed with hot towels. He thanked God for revealing his Son to him in whom he had believed. His companions, Justus Jonas and Michael Coelius, shouted loudly, "Reverend father, are you ready to die trusting in your Lord Jesus Christ and to confess the doctrine which you have taught in his name?" A distinct "Yes" was Luther's reply.

An apoplectic stroke deprived him of his speech, and he died shortly afterwards at 2:45 a.m. on 18 February 1546, aged 62, in Eisleben, the city of his birth. He was buried in the Schlosskirche in Wittenberg, in front of the pulpit. The funeral was held by his friends Johannes Bugenhagen and Philipp Melanchthon. A year later, troops of Luther's adversary Charles V, Holy Roman Emperor entered the town but were ordered by Charles not to disturb the grave.

A piece of paper was later found on which Luther had written his last statement. The statement was in Latin, apart from "We are beggars," which was in German. The statement reads:

# No one can understand Virgil's Bucolics unless he has been a shepherd for five years. No one can understand Virgil's Georgics, unless he has been a farmer for five years.
 No one can understand Cicero's Letters (or so I teach), unless he has busied himself in the affairs of some prominent state for twenty years.
 Know that no one can have indulged in the Holy Writers sufficiently, unless he has governed churches for a hundred years with the prophets, such as Elijah and Elisha, John the Baptist, Christ and the apostles.

Do not assail this divine Aeneid; nay, rather prostrate revere the ground that it treads.

We are beggars: this is true.Original German and Latin of Luther's last written words is: "Wir sein pettler. Hoc est verum." , Luther's World of Thought, tr. Martin H. Bertram (St. Louis: Concordia Publishing House, 1958), 291.

The tomb of Philipp Melanchthon, Luther's contemporary and fellow reformer, is also located in the All Saints' Church.

Legacy and commemoration

Luther made effective use of Johannes Gutenberg's printing press to spread his views. He switched from Latin to German in his writing to appeal to a broader audience. Between 1500 and 1530, Luther's works represented one fifth of all materials printed in Germany.

In the 1530s and 1540s, printed images of Luther that emphasized his monumental size were crucial to the spread of Protestantism. In contrast to images of frail Catholic saints, Luther was presented as a stout man with a "double chin, strong mouth, piercing deep-set eyes, fleshy face, and squat neck." He was shown to be physically imposing, an equal in stature to the secular German princes with whom he would join forces to spread Lutheranism. His large body also let the viewer know that he did not shun earthly pleasures like drinking—behavior that was a stark contrast to the ascetic life of the medieval religious orders. Images from this period include the woodcuts by Hans Brosamer (1530) and Lucas Cranach the Elder and Lucas Cranach the Younger (1546).

Luther is honoured on 18 February with a commemoration in the Lutheran Calendar of Saints and in the Episcopal (United States) Calendar of Saints. In the Church of England's Calendar of Saints he is commemorated on 31 October. Luther is honored in various ways by Christian traditions coming out directly from the Protestant Reformation, i.e. Lutheranism, the Reformed tradition, and Anglicanism. Branches of Protestantism that emerged afterwards vary in their remembrance and veneration of Luther, ranging from a complete lack of a single mention of him to a commemoration almost comparable to the way Lutherans commemorate and remember his persona. There is no known condemnation of Luther by Protestants themselves.

Various sites both inside and outside Germany (supposedly) visited by Martin Luther throughout his lifetime commemorate it with local memorials. Saxony-Anhalt has two towns officially named after Luther, Lutherstadt Eisleben and Lutherstadt Wittenberg. Mansfeld is sometimes called Mansfeld-Lutherstadt, although the state government has not decided to put the Lutherstadt suffix in its official name.

Reformation Day commemorates the publication of the Ninety-five Theses in 1517 by Martin Luther; it has been historically important in the following European entities. It is a civic holiday in the German states of Brandenburg, Mecklenburg-Vorpommern, Saxony, Saxony-Anhalt, Thuringia, Schleswig-Holstein and Hamburg. Two further states (Lower Saxony and Bremen) are pending a vote on introducing it. Slovenia celebrates it because of the profound contribution of the Reformation to its culture. Austria allows Protestant children not to go to school that day, and Protestant workers have a right to leave work in order to participate in a church service. Switzerland celebrates the holiday on the first Sunday after 31 October. It is also celebrated elsewhere around the world.

Luther and the swan

Luther is often depicted with a swan as his attribute, and Lutheran churches often have a swan for a weather vane. This association with the swan arises out of a prophecy reportedly made by the earlier reformer Jan Hus from Bohemia and endorsed by Luther. In the Bohemian language (now Czech), Hus's name meant "grey goose". In 1414, while imprisoned by the Council of Constance and anticipating his execution by burning for heresy, Hus prophesied, "Now they will roast a goose, but in a hundred years' time they'll hear a swan sing. They'd better listen to him." Luther published his Ninety-five Theses some 103 years later.

Works and editions

 The Erlangen Edition (Erlangener Ausgabe: "EA"), comprising the Exegetica opera latina – Latin exegetical works of Luther.
 The Weimar Edition (Weimarer Ausgabe) is the exhaustive, standard German edition of Luther's Latin and German works, indicated by the abbreviation "WA". This is continued into "WA Br" Weimarer Ausgabe, Briefwechsel (correspondence), "WA Tr" Weimarer Ausgabe, Tischreden (tabletalk) and "WA DB" Weimarer Ausgabe, Deutsche Bibel (German Bible).
 The American Edition (Luther's Works) is the most extensive English translation of Luther's writings, indicated either by the abbreviation "LW" or "AE". The first 55 volumes were published 1955–1986, and a twenty volume extension (vols. 56–75) is planned of which volumes 58, 60, and 68 have appeared thus far.

See also

 Antilegomena
 George of Hungary
 Luther's canon
 Luther's Marian theology
 Lutherhaus Eisenach
 Martin Luther's Birth House
 Propaganda during the Reformation
 Protestantism in Germany
 Resources about Martin Luther
 Theology of Martin Luther
 Bruder Martin
 Hochstratus Ovans
 Theologia Germanica

Notes

References

Sources

Further reading
For works by and about Luther, see Martin Luther (resources) or Luther's works at Wikisource.
 Atkinson, James (1968). Martin Luther and the Birth of Protestantism, in series, Pelican Book[s]. Harmondsworth, Eng.: Penguin Books. 352 pp.
 Bainton, Roland. Here I Stand: A Life of Martin Luther (Nashville: Abingdon Press, 1950), online
 Brecht, Martin. Martin Luther: His Road to Reformation 1483–1521 (vol 1, 1985); Martin Luther 1521–1532: Shaping and Defining the Reformation (vol 2, 1994); Martin Luther The Preservation of the Church Vol 3 1532–1546 (1999), a standard scholarly biography excerpts
 
 Erikson, Erik H. (1958). Young Man Luther: A Study in Psychoanalysis and History. New York: W.W. Norton.
Fife, Robert Herndon. (1928). Young Luther: The Intellectual and Religious Development of Martin Luther to 1518. New York: Macmillan.
Fife, Robert Herndon. (1957). The Revolt of Martin Luther. New York NY: Columbia University Press.
 Friedenthal, Richard (1970). Luther, His Life and Times. Trans. from the German by John Nowell. First American ed. New York: Harcourt, Brace, Jovanovich. viii, 566 p. N.B.: Trans. of the author's Luther, sein Leben und seine Zeit.
 
 
 Kolb, Robert; Dingel, Irene; Batka, Ľubomír (eds.): The Oxford Handbook of Martin Luther's Theology. Oxford: Oxford University Press, 2014. .
 Luther, M. The Bondage of the Will. Eds. J.I. Packer and O.R. Johnson. Old Tappan, NJ: Revell, 1957. .
 Luther, Martin (1974). Selected Political Writings, ed. and with an introd. by J.M. Porter. Philadelphia: Fortress Press. 
 Luther's Works, 55 vols. Eds. H.T. Lehman and J. Pelikan. St Louis, Missouri, and Philadelphia, Pennsylvania, 1955–86. Also on CD-ROM. Minneapolis and St Louis: Fortress Press and Concordia Publishing House, 2002.
 Maritain, Jacques (1941). Three Reformers: Luther, Descartes, Rousseau. New York: C. Scribner's Sons. N.B.: Reprint of the ed. published by Muhlenberg Press.
 Nettl, Paul (1948). Luther and Music, trans. by Frida Best and Ralph Wood. New York: Russell & Russell, 1967, cop. 1948. vii, 174 p.
 Reu, Johann Michael (1917). Thirty-five Years of Luther Research. Chicago: Wartburg Publishing House.
 Schalk, Carl F. (1988). Luther on Music: Paradigms of Praise. Saint Louis, Mo.: Concordia Publishing House. 
 Stang, William (1883). The Life of Martin Luther. Eighth ed. New York: Pustet & Co. N.B.: This is a work of Roman Catholic polemical nature.
 Warren Washburn Florer, Ph.D. (1912, 2012). Luther's Use of the Pre-Lutheran Versions of the Bible: Article 1, George Wahr, The Ann Arbor Press, Ann Arbor, Mich. Reprint 2012: Nabu Press,

External links

 
 
 
 
 Maarten Luther Werke
 Digitized 1543 edition of Von den Juden und ihren Luegen by Martin Luther at the Leo Baeck Institute, New York
 
 
 
 Website about Martin Luther
 Commentarius in psalmos Davidis Manuscript of Luther's first lecture as Professor of Theology at the University of Wittenberg, digital version at the Saxon State and University Library, Dresden (SLUB)
 
 Martin Luther Collection: Early works attributed to Martin Luther, (285 titles). From the Rare Book and Special Collections Division at the Library of Congress
 Robin Leaver: Luther's Liturgical Music

 
1483 births
1546 deaths
16th-century apocalypticists
16th-century Christian mystics
16th-century German Protestant theologians
16th-century German male writers
16th-century Latin-language writers
16th-century people of the Holy Roman Empire
Anglican saints
Antisemitism in Germany
Augustinian friars
Burials at All Saints' Church, Wittenberg
Christian Hebraists
Converts to Lutheranism from Roman Catholicism
Critics of Judaism
Christian critics of Islam
Critics of the Catholic Church
Founders of religions
16th-century German Lutheran clergy
German Lutheran hymnwriters
German Lutheran theologians
German male non-fiction writers
German Christian mystics
16th-century German translators
Laicized Roman Catholic priests
Latin–German translators
Lutheran sermon writers
Lutheran writers
Martin
People celebrated in the Lutheran liturgical calendar
People excommunicated by the Catholic Church
People from Eisleben
People with Ménière's Disease
Philosophers of law
Protestant mystics
German translation scholars
Translators of the Bible into German
University of Erfurt alumni
Academic staff of the University of Wittenberg
Lutheran saints